The Next Skin is a 2016 Spanish-Swiss thriller film co-directed by Isa Campo and Isaki Lacuesta, starring Àlex Monner and Emma Suárez.

Suárez won the Goya Award for Best Supporting Actress at the 31st Goya Awards.

Cast

Awards

See also 
 List of Spanish films of 2016

References

External links
 
 

2016 films
2016 thriller films
Spanish thriller films
Swiss thriller films
2010s Spanish-language films
2010s Spanish films
2010s Catalan-language films